Anatoliy Yakovych Kuksov (21 November 1949 –  January 2022) was a Soviet football player and a Ukrainian coach. He was the most capped player for FC Zorya Luhansk and one of the longest serving coaches of the club. In 2007–08 Kuksov unsuccessfully tried to create another professional club in city FC Komunalnyk Luhansk. In 2015 he became a coach of the Russian-occupied Luhansk region team.

International career
Kuksov made his debut for the USSR national team on 2 July 1972 in a friendly against Argentina.

Five of eight games for the Soviet team, Kuksov played at the 1972 Olympic football competition.

Personal life and death
His grandson is the volleyball player Dmytro Filippov. Kuksov died in Luhansk in January 2022, at the age of 72.

Honours
 Soviet Top League: 1972
 Summer Olympics: 1972; olympic bronze

References

External links
  Profile

1949 births
2022 deaths
Footballers from Luhansk
Soviet footballers
Ukrainian footballers
Association football midfielders
Soviet Union international footballers
Olympic footballers of the Soviet Union
Medalists at the 1972 Summer Olympics
Olympic bronze medalists for the Soviet Union
Footballers at the 1972 Summer Olympics
Olympic medalists in football
Soviet Top League players
FC Zorya Luhansk players
Ukrainian football managers
Ukrainian Premier League managers
FC Zorya Luhansk managers
FC Metalurh Zaporizhzhia managers
FC Mariupol managers